WXHL-FM (89.1 FM) is a non-commercial radio station licensed to Christiana, Delaware, and serving the Wilmington metropolitan area. It has an urban gospel radio format with some Christian talk and teaching programs and is owned by Priority Radio, Inc.  It is part of the Reach Gospel Radio Network.

History
The station was assigned the call letters WXHL on November 5, 1992. On February 15, 2002, the station changed its call sign to the current WXHL-FM.

On September 22, 2017, owner Priority Radio flipped its network of stations and translators from Christian AC "Reach FM" to urban gospel "Reach Gospel Radio".

Translators
In addition to the main station, WXHL-FM is relayed by 11 FM translators, two Class A FM stations (88.3 MHz WVBH in Beach Haven West, New Jersey and 91.9 MHz WXHM in Middletown, Delaware), and one AM station (1550 AM WSRY in Elkton, Maryland).

Full-powered stations

Translators

Previous logo

References

External links
 Reach Gospel Radio

Radio stations established in 1995
1995 establishments in Delaware
Gospel radio stations in the United States
XHL-FM